The New World of the Gnomes (Spanish: El Nuevo Mundo de los Gnomos) is a Spanish animated adventure series produced by Spanish studio BRB Internacional and Televisión Española. It was a spin-off of the series The World of David the Gnome and based on the children's book The Secret Book of Gnomes, by the Dutch author Wil Huygen and illustrator Rien Poortvliet. David the Gnome travels the world with his nephew Tomte as they protect the world from trolls polluting the world. The show was also made in collaboration with the WWF (World Wildlife Foundation).

In the United States, the show was ran on the aired on January 15, 2002, to October 6, 2002, of the two blocks on TeleFutura program block, Mi Tele. Later the show were moved to Toonturama on the weekend morning block beginning on March 23, 2002.

References

External links
 

1997 Spanish television series debuts
1997 Spanish television series endings
1990s children's television series
1990s Spanish television series
Spanish children's animated fantasy television series
RTVE shows
Television shows based on children's books
Fictional gnomes